KRLG-LP (107.9 FM) is a radio station licensed to Kremmling, Colorado, United States.  The station is currently owned by State of Colorado Telecommunication Services.

References

External links
 

RLG-LP
RLG-LP